The Office of Juvenile Justice and Delinquency Prevention (OJJDP) is an office of the United States Department of Justice and a component of the Office of Justice Programs. The OJJDP publishes the JRFC Databook on even numbered years for information on youth detention.

OJJDP sponsors research, program, and training initiatives; develops priorities and goals and sets policies to guide federal juvenile justice issues. OJJDP also disseminates information about juvenile justice issues and awards funds to states to support local programming nationwide through the office's five organizational components.

The office cooperates with other federal agencies on special projects.  For example, it formed the National Gang Center along with the Office of Justice Programs (OJP) and the Bureau of Justice Assistance (BJA). The OJJDP has the National Youth Gang Center linked through the National Gang Center.

OJJDP, a component of the Office of Justice Programs (OJP), supports states, local communities and tribal jurisdictions in their efforts to develop and implement effective programs for juveniles. The office strives to strengthen the juvenile justice system’s efforts to protect public safety, hold offenders accountable and provide services that address the needs of youth and their families. Through its components, OJJDP sponsors research; program and training initiatives; develops priorities and goals; sets policies to guide federal juvenile justice issues; disseminates information about juvenile justice issues, and awards funds to states to support local programming.

In May 2022, President Joe Biden appointed Liz Ryan as administrator.

References

External links

 Juvenile Justice Programs account on USAspending.gov

United States Department of Justice agencies
Criminal justice
United States Department of Justice